The Chapel of San Fausto (Spanish: Capilla de San Fausto) is a chapel located in Mejorada del Campo, Spain. It was declared Bien de Interés Cultural in 1986.

Designed by Matías Román, it was constructed between 1687 and 1691.

References 

Churches in the Community of Madrid
Bien de Interés Cultural landmarks in the Community of Madrid
Roman Catholic chapels in Spain